Scooby-Doo! and the Monster of Mexico is a 2003 American direct-to-video animated adventure film; the sixth in a series of direct-to-video films based upon the Scooby-Doo Saturday morning cartoons. It was released on September 30, 2003, and it was produced by Warner Bros. Animation.

It is the second and final film (after Scooby-Doo! and the Legend of the Vampire) to briefly reunite the surviving or available voice cast from the original 1969 series, with Frank Welker voicing Scooby-Doo in place of the late Don Messick. The film also marks the last time Nicole Jaffe and Heather North voice Velma and Daphne respectively, before North's death on November 29, 2017.

Plot

Fred's pen-pal, Alejo Otero, who lives in Veracruz, Mexico, invites Fred and the rest of the gang to visit him and his family there. Fred and the rest of the gang talk about it until they decide to go. However, after Alejo sent the invitation to Fred, a big long-haired monster started to terrorize the population of Veracruz. Alejo and his young son, Jorge, and their pet Chihuahua, Chiquita, see the monster, and the locals start calling him "El Chupacabra".

Later, when Mystery, Inc. arrives in Veracruz, they meet Alejo, who recognizes them all from Fred's letters, though is confused as to how Shaggy's description is a fair representation of his eating habits. Alejo and his family run a huge and fancy hotel, and he shows them around and where they will be staying. He then introduces to them his family, which includes his wife, Sofia, his mother, Doña Dolores, his brother Luis, and Luis's fiancée, Charlene, who is originally from the United States. Luis tells the gang he met Charlene when he visited America, at a theme park run by Mr. Smiley. The gang and the Otero family enjoy a meal, and Dolores talks about her late husband. Then, a man named Señor Fuente arrives and asks to speak with Alejo and Luis. Dolores tells the gang that Fuente has been trying to get her to sell the hotel to him ever since her husband died the previous year. Meanwhile, Alejo and Luis tell Fuente once again that they do not want to sell the hotel. Fuente leaves, and the family go inside because of a fierce storm. When inside, Alejo's forced to tell the gang about El Chupacabra. He says that he does not have many other guests besides the gang because El Chupacabra has been scaring them away. Luis and Charlene tell the gang to lock their doors when they go to sleep.

During the night, Shaggy and Scooby-Doo are scared when they think they hear a noise. They then hear a loud growl and run screaming out of their cottage. After seeing footprints outside of Shaggy and Scooby's window, Fred declares that there is a mystery they have to solve. The next day, the gang and the Otero brothers set out to search for El Chupacabra. Charlene gives Luis a charm for good luck. Daphne interviews the townspeople, but none of them are able to find El Chupacabra. When they get back to the Mystery Machine, they find someone has written a threat written in Spanish on it, warning them to get out of solving the mystery. The gang realizes this is serious and decide to search at night. Fred, Velma and Daphne go one way, Alejo and Luis go another way, and Shaggy and Scooby stay at the Mystery Machine.

At night, Shaggy and Scooby sleep in the van, while someone drains their brake fluid. Fred, Velma and Daphne search the woods, and find El Curandero, a medicine man. El Curandero tells them they need to look at history and that they are in grave danger. Meanwhile, Alejo and Luis are searching when Alejo sees El Chupacabra. Alejo is chased and nearly falls off a cliff. He calls for Luis, but there is no answer. El Chupacabra disappears, and Luis shows up, saying he was knocked on the head by El Chupacabra. Luis helps his brother up from the cliff.

Shaggy and Scooby start driving, but then realize they cannot stop due to the brake fluid tank being tampered with. They meet up with Fred, Velma, Daphne, Alejo and Luis, who were being chased by El Chupacabra. Eventually, the van runs out of gas and stops right in front of a gas station. The Mystery Machine gets fixed, and Daphne gets some ice for Luis's head wound, but Luis does not have a bump on his head. The gang drives along and finds a sign to a history museum, and thinking that is what the medicine man said, go to it. When they get there, they meet a suspicious and hyper museum guide who leads them into an auditorium. There they see a performance about ancient Mexican customs. The guide then makes Daphne volunteer, and she kidnaps her. The rest of the gang find a secret passageway and follow it, until they come to Aztec pyramids. They find Daphne at the top of one and rescue her, but the tourists chase after them, after they are accused of destroying a statue. After a long chase scene and fights against giant living statues, they finally return to Veracruz.

The next day is the Day of the Dead, and all go to the cemetery, where Dolores informs them that Charlene has been captured by El Chupacabra. The family gives offerings to the grave of Señor Otero and hope Charlene can be found. Suddenly, the ghost of Señor Otero comes out of his grave and tells them to sell the hotel and the land or they will be in danger. At the same time, Fred just revealed the good luck charm Luis has is really a tracking device instead of an ancient medallion. The family cannot believe that Señor Otero would want them to sell. Scooby and Chiquita follows a beeping noise that is activated by pushing the button from the tracking device until they find a man in a skeleton suit controlling the ghost. The gang catches him, and he is revealed to be Mr. Smiley. They deduce that he started the Chupacabra scheme so he could force the locals to sell their land and allow him to build his theme park. Him kidnapping Daphne and framing the gang as vandals was his way of creating bad publicity for the pyramids, his sole competitor for the thousands of tourist dollars. As they are about to close the mystery, El Chupacabra appears and scares everyone.

After chasing the gang, El Chupacabra is caught up in some wiring. As they all gather around El Chupacabra, the culprit is revealed to be the museum guide when she climbs out of the suit. She tells them she was an actor who worked at Mr. Smiley's theme park where they met and fell in love and that they were going to get all the land. Luis asks what happened to Charlene, and the guide tells him he will never see her again and he should forget about her. Suddenly, the Oteros reveal that the offerings they left for Señor Otero have disappeared, all except for the one from Charlene. Velma then guesses something is up and realizes the guide is wearing a wig and glasses to hide their identity, and pulls it off to reveal that Charlene was the guide and El Chupacabra. Her true identity is given away by the random tossing of coffee beans, a trait Charlene adopted from working in the hotel cafe all day. Charlene revealed that she, knowing Smiley's Chupacabra scam wouldn't scare them off, intended to scam the Oteros out of their land once she married Luis. Fred realized they were behind it when he noticed that the message written on the Mystery Machine ("Sal ahora o no veras el dia de manana!" - Leave today or you won't see tomorrow!) was not written in proper Spanish (as the word "manana" should have been "mañana"), so whoever made the threat had to have been someone who could not understand the language.

Señor Fuente then comes in and says that even though he wanted to buy the Otero family's land, he eventually came to respect the fact that they did not want to sell it. Fuente explains that he learned of Mr. Smiley and Charlene's plans and wanted to warn the Oteros and Mystery Inc. of what was really going on. Luis admits that the real reason he did not come to Alejo's rescue because he was paralyzed with fear — after their father died the previous year, Luis was afraid of losing Alejo, so he lied by saying that El Chupacabra had knocked him unconscious. Alejo comforts Luis and assures him that there are worse things than being a coward, to which Shaggy adds how he has "made a career out of it." In the end, everybody enjoys the Day of the Dead festivities.

Voice cast
 Frank Welker as Scooby-Doo, Fred Jones, El Chupacabra 
 Casey Kasem as Shaggy Rogers
 Heather North as Daphne Blake (in her final film role before retirement and death)
 Nicole Jaffe as Velma Dinkley
 Eddie Santiago as Alejo Otero
 Jesse Borrego as Luis Otero
 Candi Milo as Charlene/Museum Guide
 Rita Moreno as Doña Dolores
 Maria Canals as Sofia Otero / Old Woman 
 Brandon Gonzalez as Jorge Otero
 Rip Taylor as Mr. Smiley / Ghost of Señor Otero
 Cástulo Guerra as Señor Fuente
 Benito Martinez as El Curandero

References

External links

 
 

2003 direct-to-video films
2000s American animated films
American mystery films
Scooby-Doo direct-to-video animated films
Films set in Mexico
Films about cryptids
Day of the Dead films
Warner Bros. Animation animated films
2003 animated films
2003 films
Warner Bros. direct-to-video animated films
American children's animated adventure films
American children's animated mystery films
American children's animated comedy films
2000s children's animated films
2000s English-language films
Films directed by Scott Jeralds
Veracruz (city)